Chetachi "Cheta" Ozougwu  (born November 18, 1988) is a former American football linebacker. He played college football at Rice and was drafted with the final pick of the seventh round of the 2011 NFL Draft by the Houston Texans, his hometown team. He has also played for the New Orleans Saints and Chicago Bears.

Early life
Ozougwu graduated from Alief Taylor High School. Ozougwu was selected to the All-District 18-5A and All Greater Houston teams, All-Academic District and Texas top 100 list. Ozougwu finished his senior year with 117 tackles, 19 tackles for a loss and 5 sacks. Ozougwu was selected to the 2007 Texas vs Louisiana All-Star game. Also lettered in track and basketball.

College career
He played college football at Rice while amassing 197 total tackles and 11 sacks. In 2007, he earned Freshman All-American honors from The Sporting News and C-USA Honors. He received numerous athletic and academic awards during his time at Rice University. He was named to the ESPN Academic All-District VI Football Team in 2010, after posting a 3.41 GPA while majoring in Economics. He was one of 30 student-athletes in the country selected for the Lowe’s Senior CLASS Award. He was named to the Arthur Ashe Sports Scholar Award 2nd Team and the Allstate AFCA Good Works Team in 2010. He was also named to the Commissioners Honor Roll each year at Rice. As a senior at Rice University, he received the Outstanding Senior Award presented by the Rice Student Association for service, leadership, and academic achievement.

Professional career

Houston Texans
He was drafted with the last pick in the seventh round of the 2011 NFL Draft by the Houston Texans, making him Mr. Irrelevant. On August 15, 2011, he made his first appearance in an NFL preseason game against the New York Jets on Monday Night Football.

Chicago Bears
On April 11, 2012, Ozougwu signed with the Bears. During his preseason debut against the Denver Broncos, Ozougwu sacked former Bear Caleb Hanie, though the Broncos would go on to win 31–3. Ozougwu had an impressive preseason by leading the Bears in sacks during the 2012 preseason with three making the 53 man roster. On April 15, 2014, Ozougwu was waived. He appeared in nine games over the past two seasons, recording 9 tackles, one sack, one tackle-for-loss, one forced fumble and five special teams tackles. Ozougwu registered 6 tackles, 1 sack and 1 forced fumble during the 2013 season.

New Orleans Saints
On May 18, 2014, Ozougwu signed a contract with the New Orleans Saints. On July 23, 2014, the Saints placed Ozougwu on injured reserve with an undisclosed injury. In March 2015, the Saints decided to part ways with Ozougwu after he failed his season ending physical with an undisclosed injury.

References

External links
 Rice Owls football bio
 Chicago Bears bio

1988 births
Living people
Players of American football from Houston
American people of Igbo descent
Igbo sportspeople
American sportspeople of Nigerian descent
American football defensive ends
American football linebackers
Rice Owls football players
Houston Texans players
Chicago Bears players
New Orleans Saints players